Sir "Sidney" Hirini Moko Haerewa Mead  (born 8 January 1927) is a New Zealand anthropologist, historian, artist, teacher, writer and prominent Māori leader. Initially training as a teacher and artist, Mead taught in many schools in the East Coast and Bay of Plenty regions, and later served as principal of several schools. After earning his PhD in 1968, he taught anthropology in several universities abroad. He returned to New Zealand in 1977 and established the first Māori studies department in the country. Mead later became a prominent Māori advocate and leader, acting in negotiations on behalf of several tribes and sitting on numerous advisory boards. He has also written extensively on Māori culture. He is currently the chair of the council of Te Whare Wānanga o Awanuiārangi.

Early life
Sidney Moko Mead was born in Wairoa, Hawke's Bay on 8 January 1927, the son of Sidney Montague Mead, a Pākehā from Wairoa, and Paranihia "Elsie" Moko, a Māori from Te Teko in the Bay of Plenty. He is of Ngāti Awa, Ngāti Tūwharetoa, Ngāi Tūhoe and Tūhourangi descent. Sidney had an older brother who died as a young child. His parents also separated while Sidney was young, and he subsequently moved with his mother to her hometown of Te Teko. Hirini is the eldest of eight children of Paranihia Moko. Te Wharekaihua Coates, Waimarama Brown, Mihaere Maurice Emery, Paretoroa Waikato, Taea Emery, Elsie Morrison and Gavin Hirikanawa (whāngai).

Growing up during the Great Depression, much of his early childhood was spent in the care of his grandmother while his mother lived elsewhere working. He attended Te Teko Native School until age nine, at which age he was taken in by a foster family in Murupara. There he was enrolled in the Rangitahi Native School. One of his teachers at the Murupara school was Bruce Biggs, who later became a prominent Māori academic and mentor to a generation of other Māori scholars. During his high school years he received a scholarship to St Stephens Anglican College in Auckland, before transferring to Te Aute College, a prominent Māori school in Hawke's Bay.

Teaching career
In 1944, Mead attended teaching college in Auckland, specialising in Māori education and art. He began teaching in Māori schools in the East Cape region, starting off at Manutahi District High School in Ruatoria and working as an itinerant teacher in many schools across the East Coast. During this time he also married June Te Rina Walker, of Ngāti Porou. Mead later taught in schools in the neighbouring Bay of Plenty region, including in the Urewera Valley, Whakatane, Tauranga and Te Kaha.

Mead became a headmaster of several schools in the region. His first appointment as headmaster was at Minginui Māori School in the Urewera Valley, where he remained in the position for eight years. He later took up headmaster positions at Waimārama Māori School and Whatawhata School. Formalising his academic qualifications, Mead earned a Diploma in teaching in 1962, followed by Bachelor and Master of Arts degrees at the University of Auckland, which were both completed by 1965. Mead earned his PhD at the University of Southern Illinois in 1968, with his former teacher Bruce Biggs acting as one of his supervisors.

Academic career
Mead taught abroad during the early 1970s, including at McMaster University and the University of British Columbia in Canada. After finishing a stint as associate professor at McMaster University's anthropology department, he returned to New Zealand and became the first Professor of Māori at the Victoria University of Wellington. After his arrival in 1977, he restructured the Māori Studies department at the university, developing it into the first stand-alone Māori Studies department in the country, starting in 1981.

In the early 1980s, Professor Mead was largely responsible for the establishment of Te Herenga Waka Marae, the first university-based marae at a mainstream campus. He was also a co-curator of Te Māori, an exhibition of Māori art and cultural treasures from museum collections that toured the United States during the mid-1980s. Professor Mead retired from the Victoria University of Wellington in 1990 after 14 years at the head of New Zealand's first Māori studies department.

Māori leader
From the 1970s onwards, Mead became more involved in tribal affairs, particularly those of Ngāti Awa. He helped to establish the Ngāti Awa Trust Board in 1980, the first representative body for the tribe in the 20th century. For almost 20 years the Trust Board helped to research and prepare Ngāti Awa's case for historical redress with the Waitangi Tribunal. This led to the publication of the Ngāti Awa Raupatu Report in 1999, which outlined Ngāti Awa's historical grievances dating back to the New Zealand Wars and subsequent land confiscations. Mead acted as chief negotiator for the tribe during settlement negotiations with the Crown. Five years from the publication of the raupatu report, a settlement between Ngāti Awa and the Crown was reached in 2003 and enacted by the government in 2005. Professor Mead also became the inaugural chair of the new Te Rūnanga o Ngāti Awa, which replaced the Ngāti Awa Trust Board as the administrative body for the iwi.

In 1992 he helped to establish Te Whare Wānanga o Awanuiārangi based in Whakatane, which in 1997 became only the third wānanga in the country recognised under the Education Act 1989. He was also appointed to Waitangi Tribunal in 2003, and has served on numerous advisory boards, including the New Zealand Bioethics council, the New Zealand Council for Educational Research, Toi Māori and Te Māori Manaaki Taonga Trust. Five years after successfully concluding Ngāti Awa's settlement with the Crown, Mead was chosen as the inaugural chair of the Institute for Post Treaty Settlement Futures, an initiative of Te Whare Wānanga o Awanuiārangi with support from Te Rūnanga o Ngāti Awa, which aims to provide strategies to help iwi with settlement negotiations with the Crown as well as managing settlement assets.

Mead was appointed to the Waitangi Tribunal in 2003. He has been a panel member for a number of Waitangi Tribunal inquiries, including the National Park district inquiry and the Te Rohe Potae district inquiry.

In the 2006 Queen's Birthday Honours, Mead was appointed a Distinguished Companion of the New Zealand Order of Merit, for services to Māori and education. In the 2009 Special Honours, following the reintroduction of titular honours by the government, Mead accepted redesignation as a Knight Companion of The New Zealand Order of Merit.

His wife June, Lady Mead, died on 27 March 2019. Linda Tuhiwai Smith, a professor of education, is their daughter.

Selected works
 1995: Te Toi Whakairo: The Art of Māori Carving. Auckland: Reed Publishing.
 1996: Tawhaki: The Deeds of a Demigod. Auckland: Reed Publishing.
 1997: Māori Art on the World Scene. Wellington: Āhua Design and matau Associates Ltd.
 1999: Taniko Weaving: Technique and Tradition. Auckland: Reed Publishing.
 2001: with Neil Grove, Ngā Pepeha a Ngā Tupuna: The Sayings of the Ancestors. Wellington: Victoria University Press, .
 2003: Tikanga Māori – Living by Māori Values. Wellington: Huia Publishers.
 2010: with Lady June Mead, The People of the Land: Images and Māori Proverbs of Aotearoa New Zealand. Wellington: Huia Publishers.

References

Bibliography
 
 

1927 births
Living people
New Zealand Māori academics
New Zealand anthropologists
New Zealand artists
20th-century New Zealand historians
New Zealand Māori writers
Academic staff of the Victoria University of Wellington
Southern Illinois University alumni
University of Auckland alumni
People educated at Te Aute College
People from Wairoa
Knights Companion of the New Zealand Order of Merit
Members of the Waitangi Tribunal
Ngāti Awa people
Ngāti Tūwharetoa people
Ngāi Tūhoe people
Tuhourangi people
21st-century New Zealand historians